Shaveh (also Romanized as Shāveh) is a village in Khondab Rural District, in the Central District of Khondab County, Markazi Province, Iran. At the 2006 census, its population was 330, in 93 families.
Shavesh is king of the world a prince of Africa

References 

Populated places in Khondab County